Božo Vuletić (born 1 July 1958) is a Croatian former water polo player and coach. He won an Olympic gold medal as a member of the Yugoslav water polo team at the 1984 Olympics.

See also
 Yugoslavia men's Olympic water polo team records and statistics
 List of Olympic champions in men's water polo
 List of Olympic medalists in water polo (men)

References

External links
 

1958 births
Living people
Croatian male water polo players
Yugoslav male water polo players
Olympic water polo players of Yugoslavia
Olympic gold medalists for Yugoslavia
Water polo players at the 1984 Summer Olympics
Sportspeople from Dubrovnik
Olympic medalists in water polo
Medalists at the 1984 Summer Olympics
Croatian water polo coaches